The Venezuelan bambuco is a musical genre is typical of the Andean region of Venezuela.  It is also found in the States of Zulia, Bolívar, Lara and in the Capital District (Caracas). The instruments typically used are piano, bass and guitar, and sometimes mandolin and flute.  Characteristic pieces include: "Mañanitas Navidenas" by Marco Antonio Useche, "Brisas del Torbes" by Luis Felipe Ramón y Rivera, “Tu Partida” by Augusto Brandt, “Serenata” by Manuel Enrique Perez
Diaz and “Hendrina” by Napoleón Lucena

See also 

Venezuelan music
Bambuco

Sources
Atlas de Tradiciones de Venezuela, Fundación Bigott, 1998, and SACVEN.

South American dances
Bambuco
Andean music